Shri Raghavendra Math, better known as Rayara Math (popularly known as Shri Raghavendra Swamy Mutt, formerly known as Kumbakonam Math, Vibhudendra Math, Dakshinadi Mutt or Vijayendra Math) is one of the Dvaita Vedanta monasteries (matha) descended from Madhvacharya through Vibudhendra Tirtha (a disciple of Ramchandra Tirtha) and their disciples based in Mantralayam. It is one of the three premier monasteries descended in the lineage of Jayatirtha the other two being Uttaradi Math and Vyasaraja Math and are jointly referred as Mathatraya. It is the pontiffs and pandits of the Mathatraya that have been the principle architects of post-Madhva Dvaita Vedanta through the centuries. Raghavendra Matha is located on the bank of Tungabhadra River in Mantralayam in Adoni taluk of Kurnool district in Andhra Pradesh, India.

History
Raghavendra Math is descended from Jagadguru Shri Madhvacharya through Vibhudendra Tirtha. The Raghavendra Math was founded by Vibhudendra Tirtha in Kumbhakonam. So, earlier the matha was known as Kumbhakonam Matha or Dakshinadi Math and later the matha was made popular as Sri Vijayendra Mutt after Vijayendra Tirtha by Sudhindra Tirtha, a disciple and successor to the pontificate of Kumbakonam Matha. After Sudhindra Tirtha his disciple, the most venerated dvaita saint Raghavendra Tirtha continued in the pontifical lineage as the pontiff of the matha. The idol of the Moola Rama is worshipped in this Math. Its headquarters are now in Mantralayam, Andhra Pradesh, although they used to be in Nanjangud, Karnataka. This mutt is highly respected among Hindus all over the world. The matha was later named after Raghavendra Tirtha as Raghavendra Matha. Other common names still include Dakshinaadi Matha.

Guru Parampara
The Guru Parampara (Lineage of Saints) of Sri Raghavendra Swamy Mutt is given below.

Sri Madhvacharya
Sri Padmanabha Tirtha
Sri Narahari Tirtha
Sri Madhava Tirtha
Sri Akshobhya Tirtha
Sri Jayatirtha
Sri Vidyadhiraja Tirtha
Sri Kavindra Thirtha
Sri Vaageesha Thirtha
Sri Ramachandra Tirtha
Sri Vibudhendra Tirtha
Sri Jitamitra Tirtha
Sri Raghunandana Tirtha
Sri Surendra Tirtha
Sri Vijayeendra Tirtha
Sri Sudhindra Tirtha
Sri Raghavendra Tirtha
Sri Yogeendra Tirtha
Sri Sooreendra Tirtha
Sri Sumateendra Tirtha
Sri Upendra Tirtha
Sri Vadeendra Tirtha
Sri Vasudhendra Tirtha
Sri Varadendra Tirtha
Sri Dheerendra Tirtha
Sri Bhuvanendra Tirtha
Sri Subodhendra Tirtha
Sri Sujanendra Tirtha
Sri Sujnanendra Tirtha
Sri Sudharmendra Tirtha
Sri Sugunendra Tirtha
Sri Suprajnendra Tirtha
Sri Sukrutheendra Tirtha
Sri Susheelendra Tirtha
Sri Suvrateendra Tirtha
Sri Suyameendra Tirtha
Sri Sujayeendra Tirtha
Sri Sushameendra Tirtha
Sri Suyateendra Tirtha
Sri Subudhendra Tirtha – (Present Pontiff)

References

Bibliography

External links
Raghavendra Math official website
 Website on Dvaita

Dvaita Vedanta
History of Karnataka
Vaishnavism
Hindu monasteries in India
Madhva mathas
Hindu temples in Thanjavur district